Rethymno Cretan Kings B.C., or simply Cretan Kings (Greek: Ρέθυμνο Κρητικοί Βασιλιάδες K.A.E.), is a Greek formerly  professional sports basketball club that was founded on the Greek island of Crete, in Rethymno, Greece, in 1986. The club is also commonly known as Rethymno B.C. (Ρέθυμνο K.A.E.).

The team was previously known as Rethymno Aegean B.C. (Ρέθυμνο Aegean K.A.E.), or Athlitikos Gymnastikos Omilos Rethymnou (Α.G.Ο.R.) (Αθλητικός Γυμναστικός Όμιλος Ρεθύμνου (Α.Γ.Ο.Ρ.). The team's parent athletic club was founded in 1965.

History
To date, Rethymno's greatest accomplishment occurred during the 2006–07 season, when the team qualified to play in the final of the Greek Cup, after defeating the top-tier level Greek League teams PAOK, Panionios, Sporting, and Kolossos Rodou. Rethymno was finally defeated by the EuroLeague powerhouse Panathinaikos, by a score of 87–48, in the final game of the 2007 Greek Cup, but nevertheless, Rethymno secured a new strong place in the Greek pro leagues after the team's showing.

After previously being named Rethymno Aegean, the club changed its name to Rethymno Cretan Kings, or simply Cretan Kings, in 2015.

In the summer of 2020, after the departure of owner Kostis Zobanakis, it was decided that the club would be voluntarily relegated to the local divisions and start anew.

Logos

Arena
Rethymno plays its home games at the Melina Merkouri Indoor Hall. The arena originally had a capacity of 1,100, but it was expanded to 1,600, when the club first joined the top-tier level Greek Basket League. There are currently plans to further expand the arena again, in the near future.

Season by season

Honors and titles
Greek Cup
Runner-up (1): 2006–07
Greek B Basket League
Champions (1): 2004–05
Greek C Basket League 2nd Group
Champions (1): 2003–04

Notable players

 Nikos Angelopoulos
 Georgios Dedas
 Periklis Dorkofikis
 Ioannis Gagaloudis
 Charis Giannopoulos
 Andreas Glyniadakis
 Kostas Kakaroudis
 Giannis Kalampokis
 Akis Kallinikidis
 Sotirios Karapostolou
 Nestoras Kommatos
 Fanis Koumpouras
 Spyros Magkounis
 Nikos Papanikolaou
 Ioannis Psathas
 Apollon Tsochlas
 Ian Vougioukas
 Gregor Arbet
 Brian Fitzpatrick
 Charlon Kloof
 Roeland Schaftenaar
 Uroš Duvnjak
 Dejan Kravić
 Damir Latović
 Stevan Nadjfeji
 Milenko Topić
 Tomas Delininkaitis
 Yaroslav Korolev
 Tarick Johnson
 Mouhammad Faye
  Steve Burtt Jr.
  Zack Wright
 Kwame Alexander
 Robert Arnold
 J'Covan Brown
 T. J. Carter
 Dionte Christmas
 Keith Clanton
 Vincent Council
 Travis Daniels
 Toarlyn Fitzpatrick
 Reggie Freeman
 Kenny Gabriel
 Shaquille Goodwin
 Ryan Harrow
 Anthony Hickey
 Damian Hollis
 Paris Horne
 Aaron Jones
 Walter Lemon Jr.
 Rashad Madden
 Stefan Moody
 Larry O'Bannon
 Brent Petway
 Gabe Pruitt
 Trevis Simpson
 Tyler Stone
 Gary Talton
 David Young
 Conner Frankamp

Head coaches

References

External links
Official Team Page 
Eurobasket.com Team Page
Rethymno Cretan Kings history at Charityidols.com
Media
Official YouTube channel

Rethymno B.C.
1986 establishments in Greece
Basketball teams in Crete
Basketball teams in Greece
Basketball teams established in 1986
Rethymno